Augustus of Anhalt-Plötzkau (Dessau, 14 July 1575 – Plötzkau, 22 August 1653), was a German prince of the House of Ascania and ruler of the unified principality of Anhalt.  From 1603, he was ruler of the principality of Anhalt-Plötzkau.

Augustus was the fourth son of Joachim Ernest, Prince of Anhalt, but second-born son of his second wife Eleonore, daughter of Christoph, Duke of Württemberg.

Life
In 1586, after the death of his father, Augustus inherited Anhalt jointly with his half- and full brothers under the regency of the eldest, John George I.

After seventeen years of joint rule, the surviving brothers agreed to a formal division of their lands in 1603.  Augustus received Plötzkau, which was created from parts of the old principality of Anhalt-Bernburg.

In 1611 he proposed publishing the two Rosicrucian manifestos together, but was unable to locate a copy of Confessio.

From 1621 until 1642, Augustus acted as regent in Anhalt-Zerbst for his infant nephew John VI, and from 1650 until 1653 in Anhalt-Köthen for another infant nephew, William Louis.

Marriage and issue
In Ansbach on 25 January 1618 Augustus married Sibylle (b. Laubach, 19 October 1590 - d. Plötzkau, 23 March 1659), daughter of John George I, Count of Solms-Laubach. They had eight children:
Johanna (b. Plötzkau, 24 November 1618 - d. Quedlinburg, 3 May 1676).
Ernest Gottlieb, Prince of Anhalt-Plötzkau (b. Plötzkau, 4 September 1620 - d. Plötzkau, 7 March 1654).
Lebrecht, Prince of Anhalt-Plötzkau, later Anhalt-Köthen (b. Plötzkau, 8 April 1622 - d. Köthen, 7 November 1669).
Dorothea (b. Zerbst, 20 June 1623 - d. Plötzkau, 6 December 1637).
Ehrenpreis (b. Zerbst, 21 July 1625 - d. Bernburg, 21 July 1626).
Sophie (b. Plötzkau, 11 July 1627 - d. Köthen, 24 November 1679).
Elisabeth (b. Plötzkau, 21 March 1630 - d. Köthen, 17 April 1692).
Emmanuel, Prince of Anhalt-Plötzkau, later Anhalt-Köthen (b. Plötzkau, 6 October 1631 - d. Köthen, 8 November 1670).

References

Princes of Anhalt
Princes of Anhalt-Plötzkau
1575 births
1653 deaths
House of Ascania